Governor Valdez or Valdes may refer to:

Juan Valdez (governor) (fl. 1710s–20s), Governor of Texas and Coahuila in 1714 and 1716
Mario López Valdez (born 1957), Governor of Sinaloa from 2011 to 2016
Jerónimo Valdés (1784–1855), Governor of Cuba from 1841 to 1843